Allen Kent (October 24, 1921 – May 1, 2014) was an information scientist.

Early life
He was born in New York City. At City College of New York he earned a degree in chemistry. During World War II, he served in the United States Army Air Forces. After the war, he worked on a classified project at MIT in mechanized document encoding and search.

Career
In 1955, he helped found the Center for Documentation Communication Research at Western Reserve University. This was "the first academic program in the field of mechanized information retrieval, first using cards, then utilizing new reel-to-reel tape technology." In 1959, he wrote an article for Harper's magazine entitled, "A Machine That Does Research" which provided one of the first insights in mainstream media about how Americans' lives can change due to electronic information technology. He joined the faculty of the University of Pittsburgh in 1963, where in 1970 he began the Department of Information Science. He retired from the university in 1992. At the time of his death, he was Distinguished Service Professor in the School of Information Sciences at the University of Pittsburgh The school named a scholarship after him.

Selective bibliography
 
 "A Machine That Does Research," (April 1959), Harper's Magazine
 Information Analysis and Retrieval, 1962
 The Encyclopedia of Library and Information Science
 The Encyclopedia of Computer Science and Technology
 The Encyclopedia of Microcomputers

Awards
 1968 Eastman Kodak Award for significant contributions to the Science of Information Technology
 1977 Award of Merit from ASIS
 1980 Best Information Science Book from ASIS

References

Archival Materials
 Archival materials 1952–1988 are held by the University of Pittsburgh per Worldcat holdings record: Allen Kent papers. 1952–1988

1921 births
2014 deaths
Information scientists
City College of New York alumni
University of Pittsburgh faculty
Case Western Reserve University faculty
United States Army Air Forces personnel of World War II